The Sumbar Dam is a rock-fill embankment dam just east of Gholaman in North Khorasan Province, Iran. The primary purpose of the dam is flood control and water supply for irrigation and municipal uses.

References

Dams in North Khorasan Province
Rock-filled dams
Bojnord County
Buildings and structures in North Khorasan Province